Marian Feter (born 13 March 1946) is a Polish former ice hockey player. He played for Polonia Bydgoszcz and BKS Bydgoszcz during his career. He also played for the Polish national team at the 1972 Winter Olympics and multiple World Championships.

References

External links
 

1946 births
Living people
Ice hockey players at the 1972 Winter Olympics
Olympic ice hockey players of Poland
Polish ice hockey defencemen
Sportspeople from Bydgoszcz